Sivarasa a/l Rasiah (born 8 December 1956), or also known as R. Sivarasa is a Malaysian politician, lawyer and human rights activist of Ceylonese and Sri Lankan descent who served as the Deputy Minister of Rural Development in the Pakatan Harapan (PH) administration under former Prime Minister Mahathir Mohamad and former Minister Rina Harun from July 2018 to the collapse of the PH administration in February 2020. He served as the Member of Parliament (MP) for Sungai Buloh from May 2018 to November 2022 and for Subang from March 2008 to May 2018. He is a member and former Vice-President of the People's Justice Party (PKR), a component party of the PH opposition coalition. He is co-founder of the Suara Rakyat Malaysia (SUARAM), a human rights non-governmental organisation (NGO).

Early life
Though today he may be one of the top and prominent lawyers in Kuala Lumpur, however, his first degree was actually in genetics. Reminiscing on his early days in an interview with the New Straits Times, Siva said, "I was trying to get into medicine after high school in Victoria Institution but didn't make the grade. Form Five was great but I guess in Form Six, there were many distractions. So instead I went into genetics in Universiti Malaya and graduated with first class honours. Six months into my Master's I realised that this was not my cup of tea and was already looking at other options.” He then applied for a Rhodes scholarship to pursue law at Oxford University. After completing his law degree and the Bar in Britain, Siva took a year off and went to Germany where he spent most of his time in libraries there reading. He worked for a bit after that in London before returning to Malaysia on his 30th birthday.

Activism and politics

It was while he was in the United Kingdom that he got interested in human rights and "became involved with union workers and stuff like that there".

His first involvement with an NGO was in 1997 when he got involved with a women's group called Citizens Against Rape. Siva got arrested twice during the 1998 Reformasi period but shrugs it off as part and parcel of the job. He later joined PKR.

In the 2008 general election, Sivarasa was elected as the Member of Parliament for Subang, defeating his opponent by a 6,000 vote majority; he went on to keep the seat in the 2013 general election.

In the 2018 general election, Sivarasa was reelected for his parliamentary seat which was renamed as Sungai Buloh in an earlier redelineation exercise.

Sivarasa was appointed Deputy Minister of Rural Development of Malaysia and sworn in on 2 July 2018 in the presence of His Majesty the Yang di Pertuan Agong of Malaysia.

Personal life
He is married to Ann James, a personality in the Malaysian theatre scene. He met his wife at a demonstration as well. "It was during Operasi Lalang and she was there too. We were kind of thrown together and that's when it all happened. After a long courtship, we finally got married in 1993", he revealed in the NST interview.

Although Sivarasa has had brushes with the police, both his father and his older brother were members of the force; his father was the registrar of the police force and his older brother was a senior police officer.

This lawyer-cum-politician is a cancer survivor who lost his voice for almost a year due to thyroid cancer which damaged a nerve on his vocal cords. He had to speak with a little boom box and a speaker for a while due to this. He has regained his voice but he says, "I can't sing or shout, but at least I still can talk.”

He is also an avid guitar player.

Election results

See all
Subang (federal constituency)
Sungai Buloh (federal constituency)

References

Living people
1956 births
People from Selangor
Malaysian politicians of Indian descent
Malaysian politicians of Tamil descent
Malaysian people of Sri Lankan Tamil descent
Malaysian Hindus
Malaysian people of Indian descent
20th-century Malaysian lawyers
Malaysian human rights activists
People's Justice Party (Malaysia) politicians
Members of the Dewan Rakyat
University of Malaya alumni
Alumni of the University of Oxford
21st-century Malaysian politicians